Seydun (also Romanized as Şeydūn; also known as Şeydān) is a city and capital of Seydun District, in Bagh-e Malek County, Khuzestan Province, Iran.  At the 2006 census, its population was 5,439, in 962 families.

References

Populated places in Bagh-e Malek County

Cities in Khuzestan Province